KQHU-LP, (98.1 FM), is a new non-commercial FM outlet serving the urban portion of the Honolulu, Hawaii area, which signed on in March 2017 with Chinese-language programming. The station is owned by New Dynasty Cultural Center and is licensed to Honolulu.

External links
 

QHU-LP
QHU-LP
Radio stations established in 2017
2017 establishments in Hawaii